New Star FC is a football club in Cameroon, Douala. They play in Elite One - the top-flight football league of Cameroon. Stade de la Réunification, which has a capacity of 30,000, is their home venue. They played in the 2016 CAF Confederation Cup.

References

External links
Club logo

Football clubs in Cameroon
Sport in Douala